Curio archeri, syn. Senecio toxotis is a species of succulent plant in the family Asteraceaethat is indigenous to the south-western Cape, South Africa.

Description

A small, low-growing succulent, with rhizomes and a few short, erect stems, with the leaves concentrated at the tip of top of each stem. The leaves are blue-green, pruinose, and typically flattened laterally. Each side of the leaf blade has several translucent lines. 

The flower capitulum has no ray florets, and appears at the tip of a slender, erect inflorescence.

Distribution
This species is indigenous to the south-western parts of the Western Cape Province, South Africa.  It occurs in rocky areas, in the western Little Karoo, in the Robertson Karoo, and in the Overberg region. 

It is closely related to Curio citriformis, which occurs in the Little Karoo to the north, as well as to Curio crassulifolius and Curio repens (syn. Senecio serpens).

References

External links

archeri
Flora of Southern Africa
Garden plants of Southern Africa
Flora of South Africa
Drought-tolerant plants
Taxa named by Robert Harold Compton